Chminianska Nová Ves is a village and municipality in Prešov District in the Prešov Region of eastern Slovakia.

History
In historical records the village was first mentioned in 1248.

Geography
The municipality lies at an altitude of 360 metres and covers an area of 10.576 km². It has a population of about 1225 people.

Notable citizens
Pál Szinyei Merse - one of the most well-known Hungarian impressionist painters

Genealogical resources

The records for genealogical research are available at the state archive "Statny Archiv in Presov, Slovakia"

 Roman Catholic church records (births/marriages/deaths): 1814-1895 (parish B)
 Greek Catholic church records (births/marriages/deaths): 1825-1898 (parish B)
 Lutheran church records (births/marriages/deaths): 1753-1895 (parish B)

See also
 List of municipalities and towns in Slovakia

References

External links
 
 
Surnames of living people in Chminianska Nova Ves

Villages and municipalities in Prešov District
Šariš